Samo language may refer to:
Samo language (Burkina)
Samo language (New Guinea)